Vaisakh is the second month in the Nanakshahi calendar. This month coincides with April and May in the Gregorian calendar and to Vaisakha in the Hindu calendar and the Indian national calendar; it comprises the time of crop-harvesting in the Punjab region.

Vaisakhi is the most important festival in the Sikh calendar, taking place on the first lunar month of Vaisakh, which falls on 14 April each year. On this day, the Khalsa was created and much celebration takes place in the form of Samagams, Nagar Kirtan, Gatka exhibitions, Akand Paths and so on.

On the 16th of this month, Guru Angad and Guru Har Krishan took leave for their higher abode and passed the Guruship to Guru Amar Das and Guru Tegh Bahadur respectively. Moreover, on the 18th, the Sikhs celebrate the birthday of Guru Angad Dev (the second Sikh Guru) and Guru Tegh Bahadur (the ninth Sikh Guru).

Important events during this month

April
 14 April (1 Vaisakh) - Vaisakhi (see above)
Ji
 15 April (2 Vaisakh) - Joti Jot of Guru Angad Dev
 16 April (3 Vaisakh) - Joti Jot of Guru Angad Dev
 16 April (3 Vaisakh) - Gur Gadi of Guru Amar Das Ji
 16 April (3 Vaisakh) - Joti Jot Guru Har Krishan Ji
 16 April (3 Vaisakh) - Gur Gadi of Guru Tegh Bahadur Ji
 18 April (5 Vaisakh) - Birth of Guru Angad Dev Ji
 18 April (5 Vaisakh) - Birth of Guru Tegh Bahadur Ji

May
 2 May (19 Vaisakh) - Birth of Guru Arjan Dev Ji
 15 May (1 Jeth) - The end of the month Vaisakh and the start of Jeth

Sources
 p. 133 of the Sri Guru Granth Sahib on Sri Granth

See also
Vaisakha

Months of the Nanakshahi calendar
Sikh terminology